Chelsea Nichelle Gray (born October 8, 1992) is an American professional basketball player for the Las Vegas Aces of the Women's National Basketball Association (WNBA).  She was the eleventh pick in the 2014 WNBA Draft. She missed the 2014 WNBA season due to injury, but she made her debut with the Sun in the 2015 WNBA season. Gray won her first title with the Los Angeles Sparks in 2016. She won her second title with the Las Vegas Aces in the 2022 WNBA Finals, where she was named Finals MVP.

College career
Joanne P. McCallie coached Duke's women's basketball team during the time Gray played for the Duke Blue Devils. In Gray's junior year at Duke (February 2013), she fractured her knee which caused her to be sidelined the rest of her junior year and her whole senior year. Despite this she was drafted to the Connecticut Sun in 2014.

WNBA career
Gray was drafted 11th overall by the Connecticut Sun in the 2014 WNBA draft. She sat out the 2014 season while recovering from a right knee injury that she sustained in January of her senior year while playing at Duke.

Gray would come back healthy in time for the 2015 season. Coming off the bench for the Sun, she averaged 6.9 ppg. 

Prior to the 2016 season, Gray was traded to the Los Angeles Sparks along with two first round picks in the 2016 WNBA draft and a first round pick in the 2017 WNBA draft in exchange for draft rights to Jonquel Jones and the 17th pick in the 2016 WNBA Draft. Joining forces with Candace Parker, Kristi Toliver and Nneka Ogwumike, Gray would come off the bench as the back-up point guard on the Sparks roster, playing 33 games with 1 start and averaging 5.9 ppg. The Sparks were a championship contender in the league, finishing 26–8. The Sparks were the number 2 seed in the league with a double-bye to the semi-finals (the last round before the WNBA Finals) facing the Chicago Sky due to the WNBA's new playoff format. The Sparks defeated the Sky 3–1 in the series, advancing to the WNBA Finals for the first time since 2003. In the Finals, the Sparks were up against the championship-defending Minnesota Lynx. Gray's playing time would be slightly increased in the Finals and was able to provide an offensive spark off the bench for the Sparks. In Game 4 with the Sparks up 2–1, Gray scored a team-high 20 points off the bench in 24 minutes of play, but the Sparks still lost the game. In the decisive Game 5, Gray scored 11 consecutive points for the Sparks in the second half. The Sparks would win Game 5 and the 2016 WNBA Championship.

With Toliver leaving the Sparks in free agency to join the Washington Mystics, Gray would be moved to starting point guard, following her heroic off-the-bench performance in the Finals. Gray would have a breakout season in 2017 as she scored a career-high 25 points on May 27, 2017, in a 75–73 loss to the Atlanta Dream. Gray would also be voted into the 2017 WNBA All-Star Game, making it her first career all-star game appearance. She finished off the season leading the league in three-point field goal percentage and averaged career-highs in scoring, rebounds, assists and minutes as the Sparks finished second place in the league with a 26–8 record, receiving a double-bye to the semi-finals. The Sparks would go on to advance to the Finals for the second season in a row, after defeating the Phoenix Mercury in a 3-game sweep, setting up a rematch with the Lynx. In Game 1 of the 2017 WNBA Finals, Gray scored a new career-high 27 points and hit the game-winning shot with 2 seconds left, sealing an 85–84 victory to give the Sparks a 1–0 series lead. However, the Sparks would lose in five games, failing to win back-to-back championships.

On May 20, 2018, in the Sparks' season opener against the Lynx, Gray scored 18 points along with a game-winning layup at the buzzer in a 77–76 victory. Later on in the season, Gray would be voted into the 2018 WNBA All-Star Game, for her second career all-star appearance. Gray finished off the season averaging a new career-highs in scoring, steals, assists and rebounds. The Sparks finished as the number 6 seed in the league with a 19–15 record. In the first round elimination game they would defeat the Lynx 75–68 in which Gray Gray scored a season-high 26 points. The Sparks would advance to the second round elimination game where they would lose 96–64 to the Washington Mystics.

On April 30, 2019, Gray re-signed with the Sparks. On July 7, 2019, Gray recorded her first triple-double with 13 points, 13 assists, and 10 rebounds in a 98–81 win against the Washington Mystics, becoming both the ninth player in league history and the third player in Sparks' franchise history to record a triple-double. Gray would also be voted into the 2019 WNBA All-Star Game, making it her third all-star appearance. On August 29, 2019, Gray scored a career-high 30 points in a 87–83 win against the Indiana Fever. By the end of the season, the Sparks finished as the number 3 seed with a 22–12 record, receiving a bye to the second round. In the second round elimination game, the Sparks defeated the defending champions Seattle Storm 92–69. In the semi-finals, the Sparks were defeated in a three-game sweep by the Connecticut Sun.

In the 2020 WNBA season, Gray started all 22 games played for the Sparks, the season was shortened in a bubble at IMG Academy due to the COVID-19 pandemic. On August 28, 2020, Gray scored a season-high 27 points in a 80–76 victory over the Connecticut Sun. The Sparks finished 15–7 with the number 3 seed, receiving a bye to the second round but were eliminated by the seventh seeded Connecticut Sun in the second round elimination game, making it the second year a row that they've been eliminated by the same team.

In 2021 free agency, Gray signed a multi-year deal with the Las Vegas Aces.

Overseas career 
Prior to her first WNBA season, Gray played in Israel for Hapoel Rishon Le-Zion in the 2014–15 off-season. In the 2015–16 off-season, Gray played in Spain for Uni Girona CB for the first portion of the off-season and spent the second portion of the off-season playing in Turkey for Abdullah Gul University. In June 2016, Gray re-signed with Abdullah Gul University for the 2016–17 off-season. In July 2017, Gray signed with Botaş SK for the 2017–18 off-season. In July 2020, Gray signed with Fenerbahçe of the Turkish league.

Career statistics

College

WNBA

Regular season 

|-
| style="text-align:left;"| 2015
| style="text-align:left;"| Connecticut
| 34 || 0 || 16.0 || .424 || .348 || .816 || 2.3 || 2.7 || 0.6 || 0.1 || 1.7 ||6.9
|-
|style="text-align:left;background:#afe6ba;"| 2016†
| style="text-align:left;"| Los Angeles
| 33|| 1 || 16.4 || .452|| .304 || .780 || 1.8 || 2.8 || 0.4 || 0.1 || 1.2 || 5.9
|-
| style="text-align:left;"| 2017
| style="text-align:left;"| Los Angeles
| 34 || 34 || 33.1 || .507|| style="background:#D3D3D3"|.482° || .827 || 3.3 || 4.4 || 1.0 || 0.2 || 1.9 || 14.8
|-
| style="text-align:left;"| 2018
| style="text-align:left;"| Los Angeles
| 34|| 34|| 32.7 || .484 || .392 || .835 || 3.4 || 5.1 || 1.4 || 0.2 || 2.3 || 14.9
|-
| style="text-align:left;"| 2019
| style="text-align:left;"| Los Angeles
| 34 || 34 || 32.6 || .416 || .382 || .917 || 3.8 || 5.9 || 1.0 || 0.1 || 3.1 || 14.5
|-
| style="text-align:left;"| 2020
| style="text-align:left;"| Los Angeles
| 22 || 22 || 30.6 || .442 || .305 || .939 || 3.7 || 5.3 || 1.6 || 0.1 || 2.7 || 14.0
|-
| style="text-align:left;"| 2021
| style="text-align:left;"| Las Vegas
| 32 || 32 || 28.9 || .454 || .380 || .889 || 2.9 || 5.9 || 1.2 || 0.3 || 2.8 || 11.1
|-
| style='text-align:left;background:#afe6ba;'|2022†
| style="text-align:left;"| Las Vegas
| 35 || 35 || 29.7 || .491 || .340 || .910 || 3.2 || 6.1 || 1.6 || 0.3 || 2.3 || 13.7
|-
| style="text-align:left;"| Career
| style="text-align:left;"| 8 years, 3 teams
| 258 || 192 || 27.4 || .461 || .378 || .883 || 3.0 || 4.7 || 1.1 || 0.2 || 2.2 || 11.9

Postseason 

|-
|style="text-align:left;background:#afe6ba;"|  2016†
| style="text-align:left;"| Los Angeles
| 9 || 0 || 22.1 || .406 || .391 || .833 || 1.7 || 2.8 || 1.1 || 0.0 || 2.4 || 9.0
|-
| style="text-align:left;"| 2017
| style="text-align:left;"| Los Angeles
| 8 || 8 || 35.6 || .461 || .333 || .778 || 3.4 || 6.8 || 1.3 || 0.2 || 2.7 || 15.1
|-
| style="text-align:left;"| 2018
| style="text-align:left;"| Los Angeles
| 2 || 2 || 31.7 || .393 || .429 || .833 || 4.0 || 4.5 || 0.0 || 0.5 || 2.0 || 16.5
|-
| style="text-align:left;"| 2019
| style="text-align:left;"| Los Angeles
| 4 || 4 || 32.4 || .367 || .333 || .667 || 3.0 || 5.3 || 1.2 || 0.2 || 2.7 || 10.5
|-
| style="text-align:left;"| 2020
| style="text-align:left;"| Los Angeles
| 1 || 1 || 35.0 || .222 || .000 || .000 || 2.0 || 0.0 || 1.0 || 0.0 || 3.0 || 4.0
|-
| style="text-align:left;"| 2021
| style="text-align:left;"| Las Vegas
| 5 || 5 || 28.4 || .462 || .389 || 1.000 || 3.2 || 6.4 || 1.0 || 0.0 || 1.2 || 15.4
|-
| style='text-align:left;background:#afe6ba;' |2022†
| style="text-align:left;"| Las Vegas
| 10 || 10 || 34.0 || .611 || .544 || .833 || 3.8 || 7.0 || 1.2 || 0.6 || 3.0 || 21.7
|-
| style="text-align:left;"| Career
| style="text-align:left;"| 7 years, 2 teams
| 39 || 30 || 30.6 || .482 || .419 || .836 || 3.0 || 5.4 || 1.1 || 0.3 || 2.5 || 14.7

Overseas

National competition

Regular season

Playoffs

Personal life 
Gray has participated in Amateur Athletic Union (AAU). In her free time, she has helped work out and train younger kids in AAU to become better athletes. She is openly lesbian. She married with former Long Beach State player Tipesa Moorer who played part of the American Samoan team at the 2015 Pacific Games on 2 November 2019.

References

External links
Duke Blue Devils bio

1992 births
Living people
All-American college women's basketball players
American expatriate basketball people in Spain
American expatriate basketball people in Turkey
American women's basketball players
Basketball players at the 2020 Summer Olympics
Basketball players from California
Connecticut Sun draft picks
Connecticut Sun players
Duke Blue Devils women's basketball players
Fenerbahçe women's basketball players
Las Vegas Aces players
American LGBT sportspeople
LGBT basketball players
LGBT people from California
Lesbian sportswomen
Los Angeles Sparks players
McDonald's High School All-Americans
Medalists at the 2020 Summer Olympics
Olympic gold medalists for the United States in basketball
Parade High School All-Americans (girls' basketball)
People from Manteca, California
Point guards
21st-century LGBT people
United States women's national basketball team players
Women's National Basketball Association All-Stars